Lynde is a surname. Notable people with the surname include:

Benjamin Lynde Sr. (1666–1749), lawyer and magistrate of the Province of Massachusetts Bay
Benjamin Lynde Jr. (1700–1781), Justice of the Massachusetts Supreme Judicial Court
Charles W. Lynde (1790–1860), New York politician
Dolphus S. Lynde (1833–1902), New York politician
Henry Lynde (died 1427 or 1428), English politician
Sir Humphrey Lynde (1579–1636), MP for Brecon
Paul Lynde (1926–1982), American actor and comedian
The Paul Lynde Show, sitcom 1972–1973
Stan Lynde (1931–2013), American comic strip artist, painter and novelist
William Pitt Lynde (1817–1885), US congressman from Milwaukee